Stollman is a surname, likely of Jewish origin. Notable people with the surname include:

 Aryeh Lev Stollman (born 1954), American writer and physician
 Bernard Stollman (1929–2015), American lawyer
 Isaac Stollman (1897–1980), Russian rabbi, author, and Zionist leader
 Phillip Stollman (c. 1906–1998), Soviet-American real estate developer, Zionist, and philanthropist

See also
Stollmann